Sport Vereniging Deva Boys was a Surinamese football club. They played their home games in Paramaribo, at the Dr. Ir. Franklin Essed Stadion.

SV Deva boys was founded in 1966, 22 May 1966.

In 2013 the club merged with F.C.S. Nacional into the Nacional Deva Boys.

References

Deva Boys